is the former governor of Yamaguchi Prefecture in Japan.

Biography
Sekinari Nii was born in Mine, Yamaguchi. He studied in University of Tokyo. After graduation in 1966, he started work in the Ministry of Home Affairs. He was elected as governor of Yamaguchi Prefecture in 1996.

References

External links 
 Official website

Governors of Yamaguchi Prefecture
University of Tokyo alumni
Politicians from Yamaguchi Prefecture
1943 births
Living people